Clerihan GAA The current South Tipperary Junior B Hurling Champions!!! is a Gaelic Athletic Association club located in the village of Clerihan, in South County Tipperary, Ireland.

Achievements
Won the South Tipperary under 16 'C' hurling and Minor 'C' football championships in 2011. Reached the County final in both but lost both. Won the U12 'C' South and County Championships in 2015. Won back to back South and County U12 'C' Hurling championships in 2019 & 2020.

 South Tipperary Junior Football Championship: (3) 1943, 1966, 2017
 South Tipperary Junior Hurling Championship: (3) 1941, 1946 & 2021
 South Tipperary Minor C Football Championship: (2) 2010, 2011 
 South Tipperary Minor C Hurling Championship: (1) 2010

References

External links
GAA Info Website
Tipperary GAA site

Gaelic games clubs in County Tipperary